Doomsday (also known as Brap: Doomsday: Back and Forth Volume 5: Live in Dresden) is a live CD from the band, Skinny Puppy.  The album was recorded at an August 20, 2000 performance at the Doomsday Festival in Dresden, Germany.  This performance marked the reunion of former bandmates, cEvin Key and Nivek Ogre.  It was the first Skinny Puppy concert since 1992, first in Europe since 1988, and first ever in the former East Germany. Skinny Puppy resumed touring in 2004 with The Greater Wrong of the Right Tour.

Track listing

Original Performance
The CD is an edited version of the concert as four songs were omitted.  The original concert setlist was as follows:
Choralone *
Deep Down Trauma Hounds
Love in Vein
Inquisition
Hardset Head *
Convulsion
Worlock
Grave Wisdom
Killing Game
Social Deception
First Aid
Testure
Dig It
Tin Omen
Nature's Revenge *
Harsh Stone White
The Choke
Smothered Hope *

* Denotes that this song was not included on the CD release.

"Hardset Head", which had never been performed live before, was to appear on the CD but was dropped due to copyright issues. It was available for download as an mp3 file on Nettwerk's website and later appeared on Back and Forth 6 in 2003.

DVD
The show was also recorded via DV video for a DVD release. Nettwerk, due to financial reasons, ultimately decided against the release.

Personnel
cEvin Key – live drums
Nivek Ogre – vocals

Backing tapes were used for the rest of the music.

Production
Stefen Herwig - Doomsday live show production
Mike Schorler & Sven Borges - Concert Promotion
Greg Reely - Recording & sound engineer
Phil Western  Programmed By (Additional)
Ernst Tochtenhagen - Local stage management
Graf Haufen - Video footage, Video production
Christian Poeck - Video production
Udo Strass - Video Projection
Alex Skull - Backline
Ellen Döhring - Additional backline
Marcus Scriba & Loki - Ogre doubles
Thomas Schöttler - Device coordination
Gunter Wessling - Device construction
Thomas Kuntz - Animatronic puppet creation
Mark Bramhill - Backup vocalist

References

Albums with cover art by Dave McKean
2001 live albums
Skinny Puppy live albums
Skinny Puppy video albums
2001 video albums
Live video albums
Nettwerk Records live albums
Nettwerk Records video albums